The Diamond T Company was an American automobile and truck manufacturer. They produced commercial and military trucks.

History

The Diamond T Motor Car Company was founded in Chicago in 1905 by C. A. Tilt. Reportedly, the company name was created when Tilt’s shoe-making father fashioned a logo featuring a big “T” (for Tilt) framed by a diamond, which signified high quality. The company's hood emblem on trucks was a sled dog in harness.  From its beginnings manufacturing touring cars, the company later became known for its trucks. By 1967, as a subsidiary of White Motor Company, it was merged with Reo Motor Company to become Diamond Reo Trucks, Inc.

During World War II, Diamond T produced a classic heavy truck in the 980/981, a prime mover which was quickly acquired by the British Purchasing Commission for duty as a tank transporter tractor. Coupled with a Rogers trailer, the truck gave sterling service with the British Army in North Africa Campaign, where its power and rugged construction allowed the rescue of damaged tanks in the most demanding of conditions.  In addition Diamond T built the entire range of the G509 series 4 ton 6X6s, including cargo, dump, semi tractor, and wrecker trucks, as well as some lighter trucks, and even G7102 half tracks. Diamond T ranked 47th among United States corporations in the value of World War II military production contracts.
Diamond T manufactured three pickup trucks:  The Model 80,201  and the Model 202.  The pickups were powered by the Hercules QX-series 6-cylinder engines.  The model 80 was produced from 1936 to 1938 and the Model 201 was produced from 1938 to 1949.

Cars 
Diamond T produced automobiles in Chicago from 1905 to 1911. The models produced were powerful touring cars of up to 70 hp.

Trucks

Commercial models
1928-1929 brought major mechanical improvements across the entire range. A closed cab with doors was introduced. All-wheel hydraulic drum brakes were used. Six-cylinder engines were available from Continental and Hercules for heavy trucks and a four-cylinder Buda powered light trucks. All trucks had geared-differential rear axles. By 1929 there were chassis load ratings (the weight of the body and payload) up to 12 tons (10,900 kg) on three axles.

1933-1935 In 1933 a new all-steel covered cab with doors and roll-up windows was introduced. In a 1935 model year style change it had been improved with a "streamlined" V-style windshield. This cab would be used on commercial and military trucks until replaced in 1951. In 1935 the trucks were  also improved mechanically and new models were introduced. They developed through the rest of the 1930s.

In 1942 improved models went into production and then stopped after only 530 units for military production of tactical trucks and half-tracks.

1946-1947 Production of commercial trucks was stopped for military production in 1942. A small number of commercial trucks began to be built in 1944 and more in 1945. In 1946, the first year of full commercial production, there were five models, in 1947 there were fourteen. After World War II heavy trucks were measured by Gross Vehicle Weight Rating (GVWR), the total weight of the chassis, body, and payload. Annual model changes were discontinued and many models continued unchanged until 1950. Gasoline and diesel engines were offered by Continental, Cummins, and Hercules. Single and tandem rear axles were available in many wheelbases.

Military models
Model 980/981 12-ton 6x4 trucks (G159) were ballast tractors used as tank transporters. Designed for the British military they were also used by the US Army. Early trucks used a standard Diamond T commercial cab (also used by the 4-ton G509 trucks). In August 1943 it was replaced with an open military cab. A long butterfly hood had vertical louvers along both sides.

A short ballast body was mounted behind a mid-mounted winch. There were closed tool compartments along both sides, two open containers in the front, and a bottom-hinged tailgate. The box could hold  of ballast to increase traction on the rear tandem axles. When paired with the M9 Rogers trailer, the combination was designated the M19 tank transporter. A number of cars were delivered to the USSR under Lend-Lease during WWII.

Model 968 4-ton 6x6 truck (G509) Prime mover cargo trucks entered production as the standard 4-ton 6x6 chassis in 1941. It was produced with both a closed steel commercial-style cab and later an open military cab. It was designed to tow a ??? gun and carry its crew and ammunition. The chassis was used for different bodies but the majority of 4-tons were Model 968s.

Standard models were powered by the 6 cyl.,  Hercules RXC engine that developed  mated to a five speed manual transmission and two speed transfer case.

Model 967 was a pre-standard prime mover cargo truck (21 were built as wreckers). Produced in early 1941, it was fitted with Hercules RXB  inline six cylinder engine. Distinguishable by one piece brush guard on the front.

Model 969 Wrecker was the US Army's standard medium wrecker during World War II. It was equipped with the Holmes W-45 heavy-duty military wrecker bed with its twin boom and two 5-ton winches at the front of the bed as well as a front-mounted winch. A variety of other recovery equipment was carried, along with its own air compressor.

Model 970
Cargo truck was designed to carry bridging pontoons. The bed is  longer than the 968.

Model 972 dump truck was the largest the US Army had during World War II. Originally they were not fitted with front winches in order to reduce front axle loading. After a Corps of Engineers request, winches were fitted from June 1944 onwards.

Model 975 was a bridge truck built for Canada.

See also
 List of automobile manufacturers
 Diamond T tank transporter
 Diamond T Doodlebug

Notes

References

External links
Diamond T (and REO) Trucks (Hank's Truck Pictures)

Defunct motor vehicle manufacturers of the United States
Defunct truck manufacturers of the United States
Motor vehicle manufacturers based in Illinois
Military trucks of the United States
Vehicle manufacturing companies established in 1905
1905 establishments in Illinois
Defunct manufacturing companies based in Illinois